Naruna is an unincorporated community in Burnet County, Texas, United States. According to the Handbook of Texas, the community had an estimated population of 45 in 2000.

History
A post office was established at Naruna in 1878 and remained in operation until 1906. William M. Spitler served as the postmaster. Mail was then sent from Lampasas. It was given the name Naruna for a ship Spitler sailed on to get to Texas. There were three churches and 150 residents in 1884. Farmers in the area shipped cotton and raised livestock. Further growth was prevented during the late-1880s, with the population dropping to 25 in 1890. It may have been caused by the completion of the Gulf, Colorado and Santa Fe Railway in 1885. It bypassed the community to the north and traveled from Lampasas to Brownwood. The population then rose to 75 in 1892 and did not return to its original prosperity. It went down to 10 in 1933, 45 in the mid-1940s, 75 in the mid-1960s, then returned to 45 from the 1970s through 2000.

Geography
It is three miles south of the Lampasas County border.

Education
Naruna had its own school in 1884. It joined the Lampasas independent school District in 1944. Today, Naruna is served by the Burnet Consolidated Independent School District.

References

Unincorporated communities in Burnet County, Texas
Unincorporated communities in Texas